Idalus herois is a moth of the family Erebidae. It was described by William Schaus in 1889. It is found in Mexico, Venezuela and Brazil.

References

herois
Moths described in 1889